The list of shipwrecks in June 1821 includes ships sunk, wrecked, or otherwise lost during June 1821.

2 June

7 June

8 June

9 June

10 June

12 June

17 June

18 June

27 June

28 June

Unknown date

References

1821-06